Elections to Three Rivers Council were held on 10 June 2004. One third of the council was up for election and the Liberal Democrat party stayed in overall control of the council. Overall turnout was 42.1%.

After the election, the composition of the council was:
Liberal Democrat 29
Conservative 12
Labour 7

Election result

Ward results

References
2004 Three Rivers election result
Local Elections: Three Rivers
Ward results

2004
2004 English local elections
2000s in Hertfordshire